Eric Murray may refer to:
Eric Murray (bridge) (1928–2018), Canadian bridge player
Eric Murray (cricketer) (1883–1971), South African cricketer
Eric Murray (footballer) (1941–2016), Scottish footballer (Kilmarnock FC)
Eric Murray (rower) (born 1982), New Zealand rower
Eric Murray (American football) (born 1994), American football cornerback